So Fresh: The Hits of Autumn 2014 is a compilation that features 22 songs that have charted the top 40 on the ARIA Charts. The album was released on 28 March 2014.

Track listing

Charts

Year-end charts

Certifications

References

2014 compilation albums
So Fresh albums